Podobin  is a village in the administrative district of Gmina Niedźwiedź, within Limanowa County, Lesser Poland Voivodeship, in southern Poland.

References

Villages in Limanowa County